Andrew Turner (born March 24, 1993) is a London, England-born rugby union player who has played for the United States men's national team. Turner has also previously played for Gordon RFC and London Scottish FC. In July 2020, Turner signed with the Bristol Bears, after being selected for England U18's development camp in February, 2020.

Club career

Gordon
Turner made his debut for Gordon RFC on April 6, 2013, starting at lock, in a 28–11 defeat to Manly. Over the course of the 2013 and 2014 Shute Shield seasons, Turner made eleven total appearances for the club, starting in five matches; he did not score during his tenure with the club.

London Scottish
Turner made his debut for London Scottish FC on September 4, 2015, starting at wing, in a 23–19 defeat to Moseley in the RFU Championship. During the 2015–16 British and Irish Cup, Turner made three total appearances for the club; he scored one try during the competition. During the 2015–16 RFU Championship season, Turner made two total appearances for the club; he did not score in either match. After the 2015–16 season, Turner did not rejoin the club.

International career

USA Eagles
Turner was first named to the roster for the USA Eagles ahead of the 2017 Americas Rugby Championship.  Turner made his debut for the Eagles on February 25, 2017, appearing as a substitute and playing at scrum-half, in a 57–9 victory against Chile. , this is the only appearance that he has made for the Eagles.

References

1993 births
Living people
English rugby union players
London Scottish F.C. players
Rugby union locks
Rugby union players from London
Rugby union scrum-halves
Rugby union wings
United States international rugby union players